Alauddin Babu (born 5 December 1991) is a Bangladeshi cricketer.

He is a promising medium-pace bowler who was discovered at 17, Babu's most conspicuous cricketing act so far has been to concede the most expensive List-A over of all time when he gave away 39 in a Dhaka Premier League match.

Under-19s career

He bowls right-arm fast bowler who can bat in middle-order was included in the Bangladesh squad for the 2010 Under-19 World Cup in New Zealand. He took a four-wicket haul in the first four-day match against England Under-19s in July 2009.

Domestic career

He first earned attention in 2008, when he took an eight-wicket haul in Dhaka's First Division League, which is the level just below the Premier League.

Earmarked as a future prospect, and consequently selected for the National Cricket Academy in 2010, he made his first-class debut for Rajshahi Division Cricket Team, and then moved to Rangpur Division when the region became a divisional cricket team the following year.

He played for Barisal Burners in the Bangladesh Premier League. He played important role in the getting Barisal Burners to get them into the finals.

In 2013, Elton Chigumbura hammered the 39 from the last over of the innings bowled Alauddin. He gave away five off the first ball which was a no-ball, and then bowled a wide. Off the next five balls, Elton Chigumbura alternated between sixes and fours before Alauddin bowled another wide and was finished off with a six. Alauddin ended up conceding a whopping 93 in his 10 overs.

In October 2018, he was named in the squad for the Rajshahi Kings team, following the draft for the 2018–19 Bangladesh Premier League.

In May 2021, he was selected to play for the Brothers Union in the 2021 Dhaka Premier Division Twenty20 Cricket League. In the 10th match of the tournament against the Legends of Rupganj, he picked up a hat-trick, being the only fifth Bangladeshi bowler to do so in Twenty20 cricket.

References

External links 
 cricketarchive
 Cricinfo

Bangladeshi cricketers
Rangpur Division cricketers
Rajshahi Division cricketers
Living people
1991 births
Abahani Limited cricketers
Mohammedan Sporting Club cricketers
Legends of Rupganj cricketers
Chittagong Division cricketers
Bangladesh East Zone cricketers
Fortune Barishal cricketers
Khulna Division cricketers
Rajshahi Royals cricketers
People from Rangpur District